The Big Muddy River Correctional Center is a medium-security state prison for men located in Ina, Jefferson County, Illinois, owned and operated by the Illinois Department of Corrections.  

The facility was first opened in 1993, and has a working capacity of 1958.

References

Prisons in Illinois
Buildings and structures in Jefferson County, Illinois
1993 establishments in Illinois